Srimanta Sankaradev Kalakshetra, commonly known as Kalakshetra, is a cultural institution in the Panjabari area of Guwahati, Assam, India, named after the medieval poet-playwright and reformer Srimanta Sankardev. It includes a cultural museum, library, a children's park, and various facilities for preserving, demonstrating and performing cultural items and history. In addition to being Northeast India's largest cultural congregation, the Kalakshetra is also a major tourist spot in Guwahati. Built in the 1990s, the artistic excellence of Assam and rest of the north-eastern region is displayed here. There are eateries, places of worship, emporiums and open-air theatres within the sprawling Kalakshetra premises. 

It is governed by a body of executives, selected by the Assam Government's Cultural Department and is headed by a Director of the Assam Civil Service or Indian Administrative Service cadre. The Kalakshetra is divided into several complexes. The Central Museum exhibits the articles used by different ethnic groups of Assam. The museum also houses several cultural objects of the state within it. The open-air theater can accommodate 2000 people and hosts cultural programs in its premises. Traditional dance and drama performances are conducted in this theater. The Kalakshetra also has the Artists' Village, which replicates the village society of Assam. The Sahitya Bhavan is the library in the Kalakshetra, which has a huge collection of rare books and manuscripts. It is a repository of the literature of the region. Another section of the art complex is the Lalit-Kala Bhavan. It is the center used for exhibitions and workshops on art and culture. A heritage park is also a part of the huge complex of the Shankardev Kalakshetra. Now a cable car facility is also available inside the park to commute the tourists. Nice view of the hills of Shillong plateau can be seen from the fields of Kalakshetra. The museum provides you a summary of Assamese Culture. The Bhupen Hazarika museum is another attraction of Kalakshetra.

The Kalakshetra houses number of structures and buildings abiding with the ethnic Assamese designs. A replica of the Rang Ghar (an Ahom Amphitheatre in Sivasagar district of Assam), is positioned in the entrance corridor to the main Central Museum. The Central Museum preserves some of the traditional articles, or artifacts of Assamese culture. The open-air theatre, with a view of the mountainous range of the Khasi Hills, is a venue for a variety of cultural events and an audience of 2000 can see the shows from the gallery seats. What can be termed as the major attraction in the Kalakshetra is an Artistic Village. This village portrays the village life of Assam in the most liveliest of form through life like statues and model thatched huts. The majority of urban children, who are now deprived of experiencing a village life due to massive urbanization, can increase their knowledge of their roots through a virtual tour of the village. The Sahitya Bhawan is an archive of Assamese texts and literatures and provides a good reference for any scholar gathering information on Assam or the related North Eastern states. The Lalit Kala Bhawan offers a world class exhibition space for arts and sculptures.A walk through the Heritage Park gives a feeling of contentment and satisfaction to any nature's child. The Kalakshetra quite often holds various workshops of dramaturgy, cinema and other performing as well as visual arts.There are murals on the center's surrounding walls. These murals depict various war moments, Bihu dances and other Assamese representations.

Gallery

See also
 Tourism in North East India
 Srimanta Sankardev Kalakshetra at GKDutta.com website

References

External links

 Organisation - Srimanta Sankaradeva Kalakshetra
 Srimanta Sankardeva Kalakshetra India Tourist Information
 SRIMANTA SANKARDEV KALAKSHETRA at guwahatitimes website

Art museums and galleries in India
Museums in Guwahati
Tourist attractions in Guwahati
Art museums established in 1996
1996 establishments in Assam
Tourism in Northeast India
Dispur